Bloomsbury Publishing plc is a British worldwide publishing house of fiction and non-fiction. It is a constituent of the FTSE SmallCap Index. Bloomsbury's head office is located in Bloomsbury, an area of the London Borough of Camden. It has a US publishing office located in New York City, an India publishing office in New Delhi, an Australia sales office in Sydney CBD and other publishing offices in the UK including in Oxford. The company's growth over the past two decades is primarily attributable to the Harry Potter series by J. K. Rowling and, from 2008, to the development of its academic and professional publishing division.

The Bloomsbury Academic & Professional division won the Bookseller Industry Award for Academic, Educational & Professional Publisher of the Year in both 2013 and 2014.

Divisions
Bloomsbury Publishing group has two separate publishing divisions—the Consumer division and the Non-Consumer division—supported by group functions, namely Sales and Marketing, Book Production, Finance and Technology. Imprints and book lists of publishing businesses acquired by Bloomsbury are assigned to the most  relevant publishing division.

History
The company was founded in 1986 by Nigel Newton, who  had previously been employed by other publishing companies. It was floated as a public registered company in 1994, raising £5.5 million, which was used to fund expansion of the company into paperback and children's books. A rights issue of shares in 1998 raised a further £6.1 million, which was used to expand the company, in particular to found a U.S. branch. In 1998, Bloomsbury USA was established. Bloomsbury USA Books for Young Readers was established in 2002, and in 2005, Bloomsbury acquired Walker & Co, a small company dedicated to publishing nonfiction. The Walker brand was discontinued in 2015 and sold to Walker Publishing Company.

In December 2008, Bloomsbury opened a branch in Doha, Qatar, under joint-partnership with Qatar Foundation. The publishing house created, called Bloomsbury Qatar Foundation Publishing, worked mainly with English and Arabic literature.

Bloomsbury Qatar Foundation Journals (BQFJ), an open access, peer reviewed academic publisher, was created in December 2010 as a joint venture with Qatar Foundation. Journal research articles were published through BQFJ's website Qscience.com. The company's partnership with Qatar Foundation ended in December 2015 and all of Bloomsbury Qatar Foundation Publishing works were incorporated in Qatari-owned HBKU Press. At the time of BQFP's dissolution it had published over 200 books. BQFJ's works were also incorporated in HBKU Press.

In 2012, Bloomsbury established a publishing office in India.

Acquisitions and imprints
Among the companies, book lists and imprints that Bloomsbury has acquired are:

 Bloomsbury Academic (1986)
 A & C Black (2000)
 Whitaker's Almanack (2002)
 T & AD Poyser (2002)
 Thomas Reed Publications (2002)
 Peter Collin Publishing (2002)
 Andrew Brodie Publications (2003)
 Walker Publishing Company (2004)
 Methuen Drama (2006)
 Berg Publishers (2008)
 John Wisden & Co (2008)
 Arden Shakespeare (2008)
 Tottel Publishing (2009)
 Bristol Classical Press (2010)
 Continuum International Publishing Group (2011)
 Absolute Press (2011)
 Fairchild Books (2012)
 Applied Visual Arts Publishing (2012)
 Hart Publishing (2013)
 Osprey Publishing (2014)
 I. B. Tauris (2018)
 Oberon Books (2019)
 Zed Books (2020)
 Red Globe Press (2021)
 Head of Zeus (2021)
 ABC-CLIO (2021).

See also

 List of largest UK book publishers
 Object Lessons

References

External links
 Bloomsbury Homepage
 Bloomsbury Investor relations website
 Bloomsbury Online Library 

1986 establishments in the United Kingdom
Book publishing companies based in London
Academic publishing companies
Publishing companies established in 1986
Companies listed on the London Stock Exchange
Multinational publishing companies